Damariscove is an uninhabited island that is part of Boothbay Harbor in Lincoln County, Maine, about  off the coast at the mouth of the Damariscotta River. The island has served in the past as a fishing settlement and a United States Coast Guard life saving station.

History
The earliest residents of the island were the Abenaki, who called the island Aquahega or "place of landing." As early as 1604, the island was settled as a commercial fishing enterprise, with Francis Popham among those sending fishing vessels there on yearly expeditions. Captain John Smith charted the island as "Damerils Iles" after a visit in 1614, with the name traditionally attributed to Humphrey Damerill. Damerill had been a member of the failed Popham Colony, but moved to Damariscove in 1608 to establish a store to supply the fishing community. By 1622, the island was home to 13 year-round fishermen, with 2 shallops in the winter and up to 30 sailing ships fishing the waters in the spring. The fishermen had also constructed a fort with a palisade and mounted gun. When the Pilgrims of Plymouth Colony were facing starvation in the spring of 1622, they sent a boat to Damariscove to beg for assistance. The fishermen responded by filling the colonists’ boat with cod which helped ensure the Pilgrims’ survival.

Damariscove had become a thriving community when in 1671, Massachusetts Bay Colony laid claim to the island, extending their eastern borders. Over the next few years, the Massachusetts General Court established a local government there, and appointed a military officer and constable. The court also granted a license for a house of entertainment, while assessing taxes for the first time.

On August 20, 1676, in the aftermath of King Philip's War, a massive Native American assault attacked and burned every settlement east of the Kennebec River, including the nearby settlement of Pemaquid. Approximately 300 Refugees from Pemaquid, Boothbay, Damariscotta and Sheepscot converged on the island, seeking shelter. Despite the presence at the time of farms, a fort and a tavern, there were not enough provisions to support this many refugees. When nearby Fisherman's Island was attacked a few days later, everyone crowded into boats and fled to the better protected Monhegan Island to the east. The residents did not abandon the island for long, as records indicate that a sloop was seized and a man killed in another raid later that year.

Damariscove was also the target of attacks at the start of King William's War in 1689. Richard Pattishall, who had bought the island in 1685, was slain in the first attack. In another raid that summer, thirteen Abenaki were driven back, and no casualties were reported. Despite additional attacks in 1697 and during Father Rale's War in 1725, Damariscove Island continued to survive as a fishing station. In 1717, Damariscove was the destination of the pirate Black Sam Bellamy after taking 53 ships and over sixty cannon; but on April 26 of 1717 his ship, Whydah Galley, wrecked on the backside of Cape Cod before he could reach the island. According to historian and pirateologist Kenneth J. Kinkor and the Boston trial records of the Whydah's survivors, it was the intent of Bellamy to establish a pirate republic on Damariscove and join forces with the Pirate Republic of the Bahamas, thus completely blockading the entire Eastern seaboard and wrestling control of North America from England and the rest of Europe.

By the time of the American Revolution, farming had begun to play a significant role on the island. Just prior to the Burning of Falmouth in 1775, Captain Henry Mowatt raided the island, burning at least one home to the ground. Historical records show that Mowatt's forces carried off seventy-eight sheep and three hogs.

By the late 19th century, most farming and fishing had moved elsewhere, while many of the surrounding areas, such as Squirrel Island, Southport and Boothbay Harbor were developing into resort communities. The remaining inhabitants of Damariscove Island primarily made a living dairy farming, with some additional income from fishing and running an ice house with ice harvested from the fresh water pond on the island. The produce was delivered by boat to local hotels and summer communities. As recently as 1914, there was a large enough population on the island to establish a school, but by 1917, enough families had moved off the island for the school to close.

U.S. Coast Guard station
In 1897, the Damariscove Lifesaving Station was built on the island in response to the frequent shipwrecks on the ledges and shoals that surround the island. The station, which still stands today at the southern end of the harbor, was manned by the United States Life-Saving Service and later the U.S. Coast Guard until 1959. The station was entered into the National Register of Historic Places in 1987.

Present day
Damariscove Island has been protected land since the majority of the island was donated to The Nature Conservancy by Mr. and Mrs. K.L. Parker in 1966. Prior to the summer of 2005, The Nature Conservancy transferred ownership of the island to the Boothbay Region Land Trust (BRLT), while maintaining a "forever wild" conservation easement. While the life station and surrounding area remains under private ownership, the remainder of the island is now uninhabited. Damariscove harbor is still actively used for moorings and storage docks by the local commercial fishing fleet. BRLT maintains two guest moorings, the stone pier, and several hiking trails that are open to the public during the summer. The northern half of the island is a protected nesting site each spring for the common eider.

Because of the island's rich history and consequent archaeological sensitivity, most of it was listed on the National Register of Historic Places in 1978.

Wind power test site
In December 2009, Governor John Baldacci named Damariscove, together with Monhegan and Boon islands as test sites for offshore deepwater wind power technologies. The legislation permits testing off Damariscove for three years, with the intent that successful tests would lead to a permanent wind farm further offshore. Critics have called for careful oversight to ensure that local lobster fisheries and migratory bird paths are not affected.

See also
 List of islands of Maine
 National Register of Historic Places listings in Lincoln County, Maine

Notes

References
Boothbay Region Land Trust, "Damariscove Trail Guide and History".

External links
Boothbay Region Land Trust web page.

Islands of Lincoln County, Maine
Uninhabited Atlantic islands of the United States
Archaeological sites on the National Register of Historic Places in Maine
National Register of Historic Places in Lincoln County, Maine
American Revolution on the National Register of Historic Places
Boothbay, Maine
Islands of Maine
Coastal islands of Maine